Centreville–Fentress Historic District is a national historic district located at Chesapeake, Virginia. The district encompasses 24 contributing buildings and 10 contributing structures in a rural farming community that developed a small commercial core. It was developed starting in the 1880s, with the addition of the Norfolk and Elizabeth City Railroad link to the Albemarle and Chesapeake Canal.  Notable resources include the Fentress House (c. 1870s), Colonial Revival style Centerville Baptist Church (1925), New Burfoot House (1925), Queen Anne style George Jackson House (1890), the Norfolk and Elizabeth City, NC Railroad Tracks, and a 1920 commercial building.

It was listed on the National Register of Historic Places in 2003.

References

Historic districts on the National Register of Historic Places in Virginia
Queen Anne architecture in Virginia
Colonial Revival architecture in Virginia
Buildings and structures in Chesapeake, Virginia
National Register of Historic Places in Chesapeake, Virginia